Dark and Light is a "fantasy survival sandbox RPG" developed for Microsoft Windows PCs by Snail Games and released as early access on 20 July 2017.

Snail Games acquired the rights to the original Dark and Light in 2008.

References 

2017 video games
Survival video games
Windows games
Windows-only games
Unreal Engine games
Video games developed in China
Massively multiplayer online role-playing games
Fantasy video games
Snail Games games